Irina Stolyarova (Russian: Ирина Столярова; born 14 February 1966 in Moscow) is an art collector, nonconformist movement expert, and the art director of the Flying in the Wake of Light collection.

Biography
During her early career, Stolyarova worked for the journal Sovetsky Sport. She then moved to London during the mid-1990s. She started her art collection in 2010.

The first exhibition of the collection was organized in 2015 at the Modern art museum of Moscow.

Collection 
Stolyarova's collection, Flying in the Wake of Light, was gathered during the last decade and not all the Russian artists included are products of Soviet soil. Her collection is focused on the work of Russian artists of several generations, including those living in Russia, in the West, and the first émigrés generation associated with the School of Paris. Many are émigrés or children of émigrés, such as Pierre Dmitrienko (1925–1974), with a biographical background that is more Montparnasse than Arbat.

Russian art critic Alexander Rappaport, who has contributed one of the essays to Flying in the Wake of Light, qualified the Stolyarova collection as a gathering of individual and convivial voices that create  an artistic movement of its own. For J.E. Bowlt, the artists represented in Stolyarova's collection compose an aesthetic and polyphonic whole cemented around a counter-movement of Russian art. A. Borovsky aknowledged that her collection is a "free-spirited expressions of various forms of abstraction".

Artists from the Stolyarova's collection :
 Pierre Dmitrienko
 Serge Charchoune
 Leone Zak
 Andre Lanskoy
 Isaac Pailes
 Oscar Rabin 
 Vladimir Nemukhin 
 Lydia Masterkova
 Boris Sveshnikov
 Edward Steinberg
 Francisco Infante-Arana
 Evgeny Rukhin
 Jules Pascin
 Vladimir Yankilevsky
 Lev Kropivnitsky
 Yury Zlotnikov
 Dmitri Plavinsky
 Victor Pivovarov
 Andrei Grosizky
 Nikolay Vechtomov
 Oleg Tselkov
 William Brui
 Semyon Faibisovich
 Natasha Arendt
 Yury Kuper
 Maxim Kantor

References

External links
 Website of the collection (broken)
 Russian Art + Culture 

1966 births
Living people
Russian art collectors
Russian art directors
Soviet Nonconformist Art